Kwun Tong is a station on the MTR  in Hong Kong. The station was opened on 1 October 1979 as the eastern terminus of the first phase of the MTR network, called the "Modified Initial System", until the Eastern Harbour Crossing to Quarry Bay opened on 6 August 1989.

The station is elevated and open-air, unlike almost every other station on the line. Only Ngau Tau Kok and  stations are like this. Due to difficulties in installing platform screen doors (PSDs) in above ground stations, the MTR decided not to install PSDs in this station, instead installing automatic platform gates (APGs) on the station's platforms in 2011.

It is located far away from most residential areas, causing many residents of Kwun Tong to take other means of transport in order to reach the station. There is a shopping centre and office tower, named apm Millennium City 5, connected to the station.

Beneath the station building is a road tunnel which diverts traffic along Kwun Tong Road from the roundabout around the station.

History 
Kwun Tong station was opened when Modified Initial System was opened on 1 October 1979, and act as the terminus of the system, until Kwun Tong line was extended to Quarry Bay on 6 August 1989.

Station layout 

Platforms 1 and 2 share the same island platform, and it is curved, so the gap is large. Before Lam Tin station was opened, platform 1 was also used for departing westbound trains. After midnight, platform 1 is the termination platform of the Kwun Tong line, so trains can return to Kowloon Bay Depot.

Entrances/exits 
A1: Yue Man Square 
A2: Millennium City 5, APM Mall 
B1: Kwun Tong Ferry Pier Harbourfront
B2: Kwun Tong Plaza
B3: Crocodile Center
C1: Yuet Wah Street
C2: Lei Yue Mun Road
C3: Hip Wo Street
D1: Bus Terminus
D2: Hip Wo Street 
D3: Hoi Yuen Road
D4: Kwun Tong Industrial Centre

Gallery

References 

Kwun Tong
MTR stations in Kowloon
Kwun Tong line
Railway stations in Hong Kong opened in 1979